KCJ may refer to:
 Kenya Ceramic Jiko, a type of stove
 Kids Code Jeunesse, a Canadian non-profit organization
 Knight Commander of the Order of Saint Joachim
 Kobiana language (ISO code 'kcj')
 PT KAI Commuter Jabodetabek, now Kai Commuter